Sheykh Abu ol Qasem (also Romanized as Sheykh Abū ol Qāsem; also known as Kalāteh-ye Darvīsh and Sheykh Abolqāsem) is a village in Pain Velayat Rural District, in the Central District of Torbat-e Heydarieh County, Razavi Khorasan Province, Iran. At the 2006 census, its population was 223, in 54 families.

References 

Populated places in Torbat-e Heydarieh County